Martin Eberle (20 December 1930 – 15 September 1991) was a German weightlifter. He competed in the men's featherweight event at the 1964 Summer Olympics.

References

External links
 

1930 births
1991 deaths
German male weightlifters
Olympic weightlifters of the United Team of Germany
Weightlifters at the 1964 Summer Olympics
People from Memmingen
Sportspeople from Swabia (Bavaria)
20th-century German people